Nuruddin Khan is a lieutenant general of the Bangladesh Army, served as Chief of Army Staff of the Bangladesh Army (1990-1994), and served as Energy Minister of Bangladesh (1996-1997). He did not pursue a political career after the Awami League government, in which he served, ended in 2001.

Early life
Khan graduated from Gurudayal Government College in Kishoreganj.

Career 
Nuruddin Khan was commissioned from 20 PMA long course on 17 October 1959. In November 1990, then President Hossain Mohammad Ershad promoted Khan to the rank of Lieutenant General and appointed him as the Chief of Army Staff of the Bangladesh Army. He voiced support for pro-democracy protests that eventually forced Ershad to resign.

A member of the Awami League, Khan was elected MP of the 7th Bangladesh National Assembly. During his tenure as an MP, in 1996 he was appointed as the Minister of Power, Energy and Mineral Resources Affairs in the Sheikh Hasina administration. Because of his mismanagement, which resulted in power shortages in the country, among other problems, Prime Minister Sheikh Hasina dismissed him. Fuel prices doubled during the period of severe power shortages. Khan was kept on as a "minister without portfolio," enjoying numerous benefits, until the Awami League government in 2001 term ended.

Personal life 
Khan is married and has two daughters and a son. His son briefly served in the Bangladesh Army. Khan and his wife reside in DOHS Mohakhali of the capital Dhaka.

References

Year of birth missing (living people)
Living people
Chiefs of Army Staff, Bangladesh
Awami League politicians
Bangladesh Army generals
Power, Energy and Mineral Resources ministers
Bangladeshi Ministers without Portfolio
7th Jatiya Sangsad members